Jack Stuart Connors (born 24 October 1994) is an Irish footballer who plays as a defender for Hayes & Yeading United.

Connors started his career in the youth system of Fulham before joining Dagenham & Redbridge in 2011 to sign a two-year scholarship. In 2012, he joined Isthmian League Premier Division side Hendon on work experience. After completing his scholarship, he signed a professional contract with Dagenham & Redbridge in 2013.

Born in England, Connors has represented the Republic of Ireland at international level, featuring for the under-21 side.

Career
Born in the London Borough of Brent, Connors joined the youth system of Dagenham & Redbridge in 2011 on a two-year scholarship, having previously played for Fulham. In December 2012, Connors joined Isthmian League Premier Division side Hendon on work experience. His debut for the Greens came on 8 January 2013 in a 2–1 home defeat to Canvey Island. His first goal for Hendon came in his second appearance when he scored the winner in a 1–0 win against Kingstonian. His second goal for Hendon came in a 1–0 win over Leiston. His final game for Hendon was in the final game of the season, a 1–0 away defeat to Lowestoft Town. In total, Connors made 19 appearances for Hendon scoring two goals. In July 2013, after he completed his scholarship, Connors signed a one-year professional contract with the Football League Two side after impressing manager Wayne Burnett. His professional debut for the Daggers came on 3 September 2013, in a 4–1 victory over Colchester United in the Football League Trophy first round at Victoria Road. Four days later, Connors made his league debut in a 1–1 draw with Exeter City. After an extended result in the Dagger's first team playing as left back, Connors signed a new three-year contract with the club on 31 October 2013. Connors went on to make 25 appearances in his maiden season, winning the Young Player of the Year award. In March 2016, after struggling to gain a place in the first team line-up, he was sent on loan to National League side Boreham Wood on loan until the end of the season. In May 2016 as his contract expired, he was released along with eleven players as Dagenham were relegated to the National League.

In the summer of 2016, Connors signed for Ebbsfleet United and helped them to earn promotion from the National League South. In April 2018, he scored his first and only goal for Ebbsfleet in a 1–1 draw against Torquay United.

Connors joined Dover Athletic in July 2018 after his release by Ebbsfleet. He spent most of the season out on loan with Hampton & Richmond Borough.

In June 2019, Connors agreed to join Dulwich Hamlet on expiry of his contract with Dover.

Connors signed for Barnet in October 2020 after a successful trial. He left the club at the end of the season.

Connors joined Hayes & Yeading United in September 2021.

International career
Connors qualifies to play for the Republic of Ireland through his father. In May 2014, Connors received his first call-up to the under-21 side for the international friendly with Qatar in Aachen, Germany. He made his debut in that match, playing the first half in a 1–1 draw. He made his competitive debut in September 2014, in the 2015 UEFA European Under-21 Championship qualification match against Germany, which ended in a 2–0 defeat.

Career statistics

References

External links

Jack Connors profile at Dagenham & Redbridge F.C.

1994 births
Footballers from the London Borough of Brent
Republic of Ireland association footballers
Republic of Ireland under-21 international footballers
English people of Irish descent
Living people
English footballers
Association football defenders
Dagenham & Redbridge F.C. players
Hendon F.C. players
Boreham Wood F.C. players
Ebbsfleet United F.C. players
Dover Athletic F.C. players
Hampton & Richmond Borough F.C. players
Dulwich Hamlet F.C. players
Barnet F.C. players
Hayes & Yeading United F.C. players
English Football League players
National League (English football) players
Isthmian League players
Southern Football League players